Frank Tracy Wall (March 5, 1908 – March 25, 1998) was an American dairy farmer and politician who served in the Mississippi House of Representatives. Elected three times from Amite County, he was a member of the local Farm Bureau and white supremacist Citizens' Council.

Election history
Wall was elected in 1951 and 1955 alongside T. F. Badon and Britte Hughey, respectively, and was succeeded by Hughey and E. H. Hurst. In 1963, Amite was apportioned only one seat in the House, and Wall successfully challenged Hughey for the Democratic nomination.

References

External links
 

Democratic Party members of the Mississippi House of Representatives
1908 births
1998 deaths
Farmers from Mississippi
20th-century American politicians